Emotional Rollercoaster may refer to:

 "Emotional Rollercoaster" (song), a 2002 song by Vivian Green
 Emotional Rollercoaster (Maria Lawson album)
 Emotional Rollercoaster (Keke Wyatt album)